Casillas is a town and municipality in the Guatemalan department of Santa Rosa. It serves as the municipal seat for the surrounding municipality of the same name. The town's population is 7698 (2018 census) and the spoken language is Spanish.

Nearby villages include El Jute, Minas, Guadalupe, Chapas, San Juan Tapalapa, El Palmar. The nearest town is Nueva Santa Rosa.

The population is mainly Roman Catholic and the town's festivities to honour the "Cristo Negro" take place from January 12 to January 16. The fair consists of many events, including dances, a rodeo, and carnival rides.

References 

Municipalities of the Santa Rosa Department, Guatemala